Braulio Mauricio Luna Guzmán (born 8 September 1974) is a Mexican former professional footballer who played as a midfielder.

Luna made his professional debut in the Mexican League Division in 1994, playing for UNAM Pumas in a 3–3 draw match against León. He made his international debut for the Selección de fútbol de México (Mexico national team) in December 1997, playing in a friendly match against Australia. Luna also played in 1998 and 2002 FIFA World Cups.

Career statistics

International goals

|-
| 1. || December 14, 1997 || King Fahd II Stadium, Riyadh, Saudi Arabia ||  || align=center |4–0 || align=center |5–0|| 1997 FIFA Confederations Cup
|-
| 2. || February 24, 2010 || Candlestick Park, San Francisco, United States ||  ||align=center | 3–0 || align=center | 5–0 || Friendly
|}

External links

Football Database.com provides Braulio Luna's profile and stats

1974 births
Living people
Club Universidad Nacional footballers
Club América footballers
Club Necaxa footballers
C.D. Veracruz footballers
San Luis F.C. players
C.F. Pachuca players
Tecos F.C. footballers
CONCACAF Gold Cup-winning players
1997 FIFA Confederations Cup players
1998 FIFA World Cup players
2002 FIFA World Cup players
Liga MX players
Mexico international footballers
Footballers from Mexico City
Association football midfielders
Mexican footballers
1998 CONCACAF Gold Cup players
Footballers at the 1995 Pan American Games
Pan American Games silver medalists for Mexico
Pan American Games medalists in football
Medalists at the 1995 Pan American Games